CNHS may refer to:

 Cardinal Newman High School (Bellshill), a North Lanarkshire, Scotland high school.
 Cardinal Newman High School (Columbia, South Carolina), a South Carolina, USA high school.
 Cardinal Newman High School (Santa Rosa, California), a California, USA high school.
 Cardinal Newman High School (West Palm Beach, Florida), a Florida, USA high school.
 Central Newcastle High School, a Newcastle upon Tyne, UK independent girls' school.
 Central Noble High School (Albion, Indiana), an Indiana, USA high school.
 Cavite National High School, a Philippine National High School
 Colts Neck High School, a New Jersey, USA high school.